Subarnarekha ( Subarṇarekhā) is an Indian Bengali film directed by Ritwik Ghatak. It was produced in 1962 but not released until 1965. It is a part of the trilogy that includes Meghe Dhaka Tara (1960), Komal Gandhar (1961) and Subarnarekha (1962), all dealing with the aftermath of the Partition of India  in 1947 and the refugees coping with it.

Plot summary

The film tells the story of Ishwar Chakraborty, a Hindu refugee from East Pakistan after the 1947 partition of India. He goes to West Bengal with his little sister Sita where he tries to start a new life. In a refugee camp, they see the abduction of a low-caste woman and Ishwar takes her little son Abhiram with him. He gets a job at a factory in the province, near the Subarnarekha River, courtesy his college friend Rambilas. Ishwar, Sita and Abhiram arrive at Chatimpur, a small settlement near Ghatshila where they meet Mukherjee, foreman of the foundry workshop, who greets them with love. 

Abhiram is sent to Jhargram for education shortly after and Sita becomes lonely. Abhiram completes his study successfully and comes back on the very day Ishwar was appointed as the new manager. Abhiram finds that Ishwar had already arranged for his application in a German University to pursue his career further in engineering, but to his foster-brother's surprise, he refuses and decides to become a writer instead. Soon after, he and Sita realise that they are in love. But at this moment, Ishwar's fear of prejudice emerges, as he does not want his sister, a Brahmin, to marry a lower caste boy. At the same time, Abhiram's caste gets exposed to the others also when he recognizes his dying mother at rail station in front of many people. Ishwar senses danger and asks him to leave for Calcutta when he gives proposal to marry Sita. During Sita's wedding with another man, the girl and Abhiram elope and go to Calcutta. Ishwar is angry and heartbroken.

Sita and Abhiram live in the slums of Calcutta and try to make ends meet. They have a little son. One day, Abhiram gets a new job as a bus driver, but this leads to tragedy: when he accidentally hits and kills a little girl, he is lynched by the crowd. In her desperate situation, Sita is forced to think about taking up prostitution.

In the meantime, Ishwar is living a lonely and sad life in the province. When his old time friend Haraprasad comes to visit him, they decide to go to Calcutta on a binge drinking tour. They finally end up in a brothel, both completely drunk. When Ishwar staggers into one of the bedchambers, he is faced... with his own sister, whose first "client" he should become. Sita immediately recognizes him and cuts her own throat rather than have her brother see how far she has fallen. She dies. When Ishwar realizes what has happened, he breaks down.

At the end of the film, the now completely broken Ishwar meets Sita's little son, who is now his closest relative. Ishwar and Binu arrives at Ghatshila rail station. Just as the train leaves, Ishwar receives a letter from foreman Mukherjee from which he discovers that he has been sacked from his managerial job because of his honesty and the legal matters he faced after her sister killed herself. Mukherjee is now the new manager and he asks Ishwar to vacate the quarter. Ishwar, at first, feels lost but as he sees little Binu, he brightens up and decides to take the little boy into his clutches. The film ends with the two approaching the quarter along the banks of Subarnarekha, with Binu, not knowing the reality fills with joy to see his new home, the story he has been told by his mother many times, while Ishwar pants but still does not reveal the truth in order not to spoil his nephew's dream.

Credits

Cast 
 Abhi Bhattacharya as Iswar Chakraborty
 Bijon Bhattacharya as Haraprasad
 Indrani Chakraborty as Little Sita
 Gita Dey as Koushalya (Bagdi Bou)
 Mater Tarun as Little Abhiram
 Ranen Roy Choudhury as Baul
 Abanish Bandopadhyay as Hari Babu
 Radha Govinda Ghosh as Manager
 Ritwik Ghatak as Music Teacher
 Madhabi Mukhopadhyay as Sita
 Satindra Bhattacharya as Abhiram
 Jahor Roy as Mukherjee (Foreman)
 Umanath Bhattacharya as Akhil Babu
 Sita Mukhopadhyay as Kajal Didi
 Pitambar as Rambilas

Crew 
Story: Ritwik Ghatak, Radheshyam Jhunjhunwala
Screenplay: Ritwik Ghatak
Cinematography: Dilip Rajan Mukherjee
Editing: Ramesh Joshi
Sound: Satyen Chatterjee
Art Direction: Rabi Chatterjee
Music: Ustad Bahadur Khan

Soundtrack
The film's soundtrack consists of the following songs composed by Ustad Bahadur Khan:

 Aaj dhaner khete roudro chhayay...
 Ali, dekh bhor bhai... kahan jage...
 Aaj ki ananda, aaj ki ananda, jhulat jhulane Shyamchanda...
 Mor dukhuya ka se kahun... aaj'''
  Khelan aaye... kuhar phuhar Accolades 
In a critics' poll of all-time greatest films conducted by Asian film magazine Cinemaya in 1998, Subarnarekha was ranked at #11 on the list. Critic Girish Shambu, director Ashim Ahluwalia and 2 others included the film on their respective lists of "The Greatest Films of All Time" (polled by Sight & Sound''), making it the 322nd best film according to the Directors' poll. Ahluwalia considers it to be "one of the most intuitive, messy and haunting films ever made with the best drunk taxi ride in the history of cinema."

References

External links
 
 Subarnarekha: film analysis at Let's talk about Bollywood

1965 films
Bengali-language Indian films
Films set in Kolkata
Films directed by Ritwik Ghatak
Films set in the partition of India
1960s Bengali-language films
Films set in Jamshedpur